Fusinus stannum is a species of sea snail, a marine gastropod mollusc. It is in the family Fasciolariidae, which includes the spindle snails and tulip snails. The species was discovered in Indo-Pacific islands including Phuket Island, Andaman Islands, and Nicobar Islands. The new species was declared in 2008.

Description

Distribution

References

External links

stannum
Gastropods described in 2008